Benjamin Evan Ainsworth (born 25 September 2008) is a British child actor. He is known for portraying Miles in the Netflix series The Haunting of Bly Manor (2020), William in Disney’s Flora & Ulysses (2021), and the voice of Pinocchio in Disney's live-action remake.

Biography
While growing up in the village of Lund, Ainsworth attended the Northern Lights Drama Theatre School in Hull. At the age of ten, his first appearance on television was on the ITV soap opera Emmerdale in 2018, and in the same year performed in a production of Priscilla, Queen of the Desert on board the Norwegian Epic cruise liner.

Two years later, Ainsworth debuted in his first major production as Miles in the Netflix series The Haunting of Bly Manor (2020), a continuation of the series The Haunting of Hill House. Ainsworth starred in the Disney film Flora & Ulysses, which was released on Disney+ in 2021.

In 2022, he voiced the title character in the live-action remake of Disney's Pinocchio.

Filmography

References

External links
 

2008 births
Living people
Actors from Nottingham
English male child actors
Male actors from Yorkshire
People from the East Riding of Yorkshire